Benjamín Kuscevic Jaramillo (born 2 May 1996) is a Chilean footballer who currently plays as centre-back for Campeonato Brasileiro Série A club Coritiba.

Career

Universidad Católica
Kuscevic joined Universidad Católica's youth setup in 2011, from Unión Española. After progressing through the youth setup, he signed a professional contract with the club in 2013. Kuscevic made his first team debut on 18 May 2014, in a match against Curicó Unido for the 2014–15 Copa Chile.

Loan to Real Madrid
On 29 August 2014, Kuscevic moved on loan to Real Madrid, for one year. The move was made official on 2 September, and he was initially assigned in the Juvenil A squad.

Return to Católica
In June 2015, Kuscevic returned to Católica and was definitely promoted to the main squad by manager Mario Salas. In his first division debut, he played the full game in a 4–2 win against Universidad de Concepción on 6 February 2016.

Palmeiras
On 4 November 2020, Kuscevic signed a five-year contract with Campeonato Brasileiro Série A side Palmeiras.

Coritiba
On 10 February 2023, Kuscevic moved to Coritiba from Palmeiras on a R$3m transfer deal. He signed a three-year contract until 31 December 2026.

International career
Kuscevic is eligible to play for either the Croatia or Chile national teams, due to his Croatian origins. After representing Chile at under-17 level, he was called to the full squad for friendlies against Serbia and Poland, but did not feature in either match.

Kuscevic made his full international debut on 20 November 2018, in a friendly against Honduras, after coming on as a late substitute for Gary Medel.

Career statistics

Club

International

Honours
Universidad Católica
 Primera División de Chile: 2016–C, 2016–A, 2018, 2019, 2020
 Supercopa de Chile: 2016, 2019

Palmeiras
Copa Libertadores: 2020, 2021
Recopa Sudamericana: 2022
Campeonato Brasileiro Série A: 2022
Copa do Brasil: 2020
Campeonato Paulista: 2022

References

External links
 Profile at Real Madrid
 
 

Living people
1996 births
Chilean footballers
Chile international footballers
Chile youth international footballers
Chile under-20 international footballers
Chilean Primera División players
Club Deportivo Universidad Católica footballers
Copa Libertadores-winning players
2015 South American Youth Football Championship players
People from Santiago
Chilean people of Croatian descent
Association football central defenders
Campeonato Brasileiro Série A players
Sociedade Esportiva Palmeiras players
Coritiba Foot Ball Club players
Chilean expatriate footballers
Chilean expatriate sportspeople in Spain
Chilean expatriate sportspeople in Brazil
Expatriate footballers in Spain
Expatriate footballers in Brazil